Cooks Bay, in Mound, Minnesota, is one of many bays that make up Lake Minnetonka. It is west of Island Park, and east of Mound's Highlands neighborhood. Between the 1870s until the 1920s, Cooks Bay was known for its family hotels including Chapman House, Bartlett Place, Buena Vista Hotel, Hotel Kern, Hotel Dewey, and the Sunset Villa. Surfside Park, on the north shore of Cook's Bay, was once the home of Surfside Casino, a popular destination that began as the Chapman Boathouse in the 1870s. Today, Cook's Bay has a public boat launch located at the park, and the old Mound Depot relocated in 1967. For more about the Westonka area, visit westonkahistoricalsociety.org and the museum at 5341 Maywood Rd., Mound MN, open Saturdays, 10-2.

Bodies of water of Hennepin County, Minnesota
Bays of Minnesota